Matías Alberto Marchesini (born 3 May 1979, in Gualeguaychú) is a retired Argentine footballer, who played as a centre-back.

References
 
 

1979 births
Living people
Argentine footballers
Argentine expatriate footballers
Club Atlético Independiente footballers
Boca Juniors footballers
Club Atlético Los Andes footballers
Club América footballers
Shanghai Shenhua F.C. players
C.D. Técnico Universitario footballers
Deportes Temuco footballers
Universitario de Sucre footballers
Juventud Unida de Gualeguaychú players
CSyD Tristán Suárez footballers
C.S.D. Macará footballers
Delfín S.C. footballers
Guaraní Antonio Franco footballers
Real Cartagena footballers
Club Atlético Alvarado players
The Strongest players
Chinese Super League players
Categoría Primera A players
Bolivian Primera División players
Argentine expatriate sportspeople in Chile
Argentine expatriate sportspeople in China
Argentine expatriate sportspeople in Mexico
Argentine expatriate sportspeople in Bolivia
Argentine expatriate sportspeople in Ecuador
Argentine expatriate sportspeople in Colombia
Expatriate footballers in Chile
Expatriate footballers in China
Expatriate footballers in Mexico
Expatriate footballers in Bolivia
Expatriate footballers in Ecuador
Expatriate footballers in Colombia
Association football central defenders
Sportspeople from Entre Ríos Province